Perdida is a 1916 Brazilian silent drama film directed by Luiz de Barros and starring Erico Braga, Yole Burlini, and Leopoldo Froes.

Cast
Erico Braga 		
Yole Burlini as Nanette Lubin
Leopoldo Froes as Ricardo de Toneleiros
Gabriela Montani 	
Maria Reis 			
Miss Rosalie

References

External links
 

1916 films
Brazilian silent films
Brazilian black-and-white films
Films directed by Luiz de Barros
Brazilian drama films
1916 drama films
Silent drama films